The Criminal Investigation Department (CID) is the premier investigation agency of the State of West Bengal, India. In Bengal, Criminal Investigation Department (CID) came into existence on 1 April 1906 under Mr. C. W. C. Plowden. The first head of CID after Independence was H.N. Sarkar, IPJP. The Headquarter of CID is situated at Bhabani Bhaban, 31 Belvedere Road, Alipore, Kolkata. At present, CID West Bengal is headed by Gyanwant Singh, IPS, Addl. Director General of Police.

History 
The Indian Police Commission in 1902–03 recommended constituting Criminal Investigation Department (CID) in every province and on 21 March 1905 the Government of India accepted the proposal of the Commission. The Government issued instructions to start the department in every province by 1907. In Bengal, Criminal Investigation Department (CID) came into existence on 1 April 1906 under Mr. C.W.C. Plowden.

Divisions and Units 
CID, West Bengal has several specialized units for investigation into special cases at its headquarters and 22 DD units throughout Bengal –
 Investigation Units/Section
 DD units
 Specialized Units
 Forensic Units
 Administrative Offices

Investigation Units/Section

Specialized Units

Forensic Units

Notable cases 
CID West Bengal has been involved in many notable and unique cases apart from the usual ones.

Fake doctors case 
In April 2017 the West Bengal Medical Council tipped of West Bengal CID that several fake doctors were operating in Bengal and requested them investigate. Investigation revealed that most of the arrested fake doctors were attached to some of the well-known hospitals in the state including Kothari Medical, Belle Vue Clinic. By June 2017 over 500 fake doctors had been identified. Following this several arrests have been made and West Bengal CID along with the state health department are planning to launch an app to spot fake doctors. Fake medical institutes and medical colleges were also sealed.

Baby trafficking sale case 
The incident surfaced in November 2016 when evidence emerged detailing how one hospital was selling as many as 65 babies in one month with doctors admitting they have been involved in the trade for decades. Eight months after the case was detected, cops now claim as many as 150 hospitals are involved in this racket. The investigation led to findings related to as many as 10,000 babies changing hands illegally. Evidence led to orphanages illegally selling babies in America.

Blue Whale game case 
During the Blue Whale game outbreak in India, West Bengal CID held awareness campaigns as well as saved an engineering student from risking his life in suicide.

See also 
 West Bengal Police
 Kolkata Police
 National Investigation Agency
 Crime Investigation Department India (CID India)

References

 
Government of West Bengal
1906 establishments in British India
Government agencies established in 1906